Abdullah Al-Abdullah (Arabic: عبد الله العبد الله; born 10 January 1987) is a Saudi football (soccer) player who currently plays for Al-Omran as a defender.

External links

Honours
Al-Fateh SC
Saudi Professional League: 2012–13
Saudi Super Cup: 2013

1987 births
Living people
Saudi Arabian footballers
Al Jeel Club players
Al-Fateh SC players
Al-Rawdhah Club players
Al Omran Club players
Saudi First Division League players
Saudi Professional League players
Saudi Second Division players
Saudi Third Division players
Association football defenders
Saudi Arabian Shia Muslims